al-Wuḥsha (died after 1104), whose given name was Karīma, was a Jewish-Egyptian businesswoman ("dallāla", or broker) active in the 11th and 12th centuries.

She was the daughter of the Jewish banker Ammar of Alexandria, married Arye ben Yehudah and moved to Cairo, but divorced early, and made a business career of her own. She is known for her successful business career as well as her love life, both of which made her a remarkable exception from the otherwise secluded women in Egypt regardless of religion. She was a leading member of the Cairo business world, often appearing in court for her business tasks, in contrast to the otherwise secluded life of women in then Cairo. She also made a scandal by challenging social and sexual conventions, living with a lover and having a child with him out of wedlock, which had her banned from the synagogue in 1095. She is also known for her will from 1104, in which she donated her vast fortune to various institutions and charitable subjects within the Jewish community of Cairo.

Al-Wuhsha had a daughter named Sitt Ghazāl from her marriage to Arye ben Yehudah. A court document from December 1132 identifies Sitt Ghazal as al-Wuhsha's daughter in bold letters, indicating the extent of her mother's reputation. No daughter is mentioned in al-Wuhsha's will, which may indicate that the two women had become estranged by that point.

References 
 Emily Taitz, Sondra Henry & Cheryl Tallan,  The JPS Guide to Jewish Women: 600 B.C.E.to 1900 C.E., 2003
 S.D. Goitein, "A Jewish Business Woman of the Eleventh Century," in: Jewish Quarterly Review (Seventy-Fifth Anniversary Volume), (1967), 225–42; idem, A Mediterranean Society, 3 (1978; rep. 1988), 346–52.
 S. D. Goitein, A Mediterranean Society: The family

11th-century Jews
12th-century Jews
11th-century women
12th-century businesspeople
11th-century Egyptian people
12th-century Egyptian people
Medieval Jewish women
Medieval bankers
11th-century businesspeople
11th-century people from the Fatimid Caliphate
12th-century people from the Fatimid Caliphate
Medieval Egyptian Jews
Medieval businesswomen